Reznikov is a rural locality (a khutor) in Alexeyevsky District, Belgorod Oblast, Russia. The population was 1 as of 2010. There is 1 street.

Geography 
Reznikov is located 12 km southeast of Alexeyevka (the district's administrative centre) by road. Batlukov is the nearest rural locality.

References 

Rural localities in Alexeyevsky District, Belgorod Oblast
Biryuchensky Uyezd